Otto Wiedmer (born 1 November 1889, date of death unknown) was a Swiss racing cyclist. He was the Swiss National Road Race champion in 1913.

References

External links

1889 births
Year of death missing
Swiss male cyclists
Cyclists from Geneva